"On the Horizon" is a song released by British singer-songwriter Melanie C. It was written by her along with Rick Nowels, Gregg Alexander, and produced by Nowels and Alexander for her second studio album, Reason (2003). Selected as the album's second single, the song reached number 14 on the UK Singles Chart. Melanie C performed the song during the Reason Tour.

Music video
The music video for "On the Horizon" was directed by Howard Greenhalgh and filmed in and around Benalmadena, in Southern Spain on 9–10 April 2003. Melanie C is in Spain driving around to find duplicated images of herself that are frozen in various scenes. When she finds them, Melanie gets inside of them in order to give the scenes movement. The duplicated Melanies are at a Car Wash, playing basketball, and jumping into the water with a man. At the end of the video, Melanie and her duplicated image leave together in the car.

Track listings
 UK CD single
 "On the Horizon"  – 3:36
 "I Love You Without Trying" – 4:10

 UK DVD single
 "On the Horizon" 
 "Never Be the Same Again" 
 "Wonderland"
 Behind the scenes at video shoot

 European CD single
 "On the Horizon"  – 3:36
 "I Love You Without Trying" – 4:10
 "Goin' Down"  – 3:39

Credits and personnel
Credits are lifted from the Reason album booklet.

Studios
 Recorded at various studios in Los Angeles and London
 Mixed at O'Henry Sound Studios, 1808, Sound Gallery Studios (Los Angeles), and Mayfair Studios (London, England)
 Mastered at Metropolis Mastering (London, England)

Personnel

 Gregg Alexander – writing, production
 Melanie C – writing
 Rick Nowels – writing, backing vocals, acoustic guitars, acoustic piano, Fender Rhodes, Wurlitzer, Mellotron, Korg Trinity, horn arrangement, production
 Chris Garcia – backing vocals, chink guitar, bass, various percussion, engineering
 Rusty Anderson – electric guitars
 Charlie Judge – keyboards
 Curt Bisquera – drums
 Wayne Rodrigues – drum programming, Pro Tools editing
 Jerry Hey – trumpet, horn arrangement
 Brandon Fields – trumpet, saxophone
 Bill Reichenbach Jr. – saxophone, horn arrangement
 James Sanger – programming
 Jon Ingoldsby – mixing
 Alan Veucasovic – engineering
 Kirstin Johnson – LA project coordination
 Tim Young – mastering

Charts

Release history

References

2003 singles
2003 songs
Melanie C songs
Music videos directed by Howard Greenhalgh
Song recordings produced by Gregg Alexander
Song recordings produced by Rick Nowels
Songs written by Gregg Alexander
Songs written by Melanie C
Songs written by Rick Nowels
Virgin Records singles